Patricia Matte Larraín (born 1942/1943) is a Chilean sociologist and billionaire, a major shareholder in the Chilean forestry and paper company CMPC, founded by her father.

As of October 2015, Forbes estimated her net worth at US$2.8 billion.

She is married, with four children: María Patricia Larraín Matte, María Magdalena Larraín Matte, Jorge Bernardo Larraín Matte, and Jorge Gabriel Larraín Matte.

References

1940s births
Living people
Chilean businesspeople
Chilean billionaires
Female billionaires
Patricia
Pontifical Catholic University of Chile alumni
Chilean manufacturing businesspeople